Louis III (863/65—5 August 882) was King of West Francia (a precursor to the Kingdom of France) from 879 until his death in 882. He succeeded his father Louis the Stammerer, and ruled over West Francia in tandem with his brother Carloman II.  Louis controlled the northern part of West Francia (Neustria), including the capital of Paris, while Carloman controlled the southern portion (Aquitania).  Louis ruled from March 880 to 5 August 882, when he died and left the rest of West Francia to his brother. His short reign was profoundly influenced by his military success, including his defeating Vikings in August 881.

Early life
Louis was the eldest son of Louis the Stammerer and his first wife, Ansgarde of Burgundy, He was born while his father was King of Aquitaine and his grandfather Charles the Bald was ruling West Francia. Some doubts were raised about his legitimacy, mostly due to the fact that his parents had married secretly and Ansgarde was later repudiated at Charles' insistence.

When Charles died in 877, followed by Louis the Stammerer on 10 April 879, some Frankish nobles advocated electing Louis as the sole king, but another party favoured each brother ruling a separate part of the kingdom. In September 879, Louis and his brother, Carloman, were crowned at Ferrières Abbey.

Military success 
On 2 February 880, Louis was defeated by the Viking Great Heathen Army at the Battle of Lüneburg Heath. In March 880 at Amiens, Louis and his brother divided their father's kingdom, with Louis receiving the northern and western part, called Neustria. The other brother received the southern and eastern part, and Duke Boso, one of Charles the Bald's most trusted lieutenants, renounced his allegiance to both brothers and was elected King of Provence.

In the summer of 880, Louis and Carloman marched against Boso and captured Mâcon and the northern part of Provence. They then proceeded to unite their forces with those of their cousin, Charles the Fat, then ruling East Francia and Kingdom of Italy, and unsuccessfully besieged Vienne from August to November 880.

In 881, Louis III and Carloman achieved a victory against the Vikings, whose invasions had been ongoing since his grandfather's reign, at the Battle of Saucourt-en-Vimeu. The king and his victory were so acclaimed that within a year of the battle, an anonymous poet celebrated it and the king for both his prowess and piety in a short poem Ludwigslied, composed in Old High German.

Death and legacy 
Louis III, at the time of his great successes, was very young, at a mere 16 to 17 years of age. His colourful victories against the Vikings entertained the public, and he was loved by most of the Francian people. In Neustria, he was widely celebrated, and he was the most popular person in the realm.

Louis III died on 5 August 882, aged around 17, at Saint-Denis in the centre of his realm. He was chasing after a girl, who was retreating to her father's house, when he hit his head on the lintel of a low door and later died. Because Louis III had no children, his brother Carloman II became the sole king of West Francia, and the young king was buried in the royal mausoleum of the Basilica of Saint-Denis.

See also
 Charles VIII of France, another French king who died after hitting his head on a lintel.
Carloman II, the successor of Louis III.

References

Sources

Green, Dennis H. "The Ludwigslied and the Battle of Saucourt", in Judith Jesch (ed.), The Scandinavians from the Vendel Period to the Tenth Century (Oxford: Boydell Press, 2002), 281–302.
Fouracre, Paul. "The Context of the Old High German Ludwigslied", Medium Aevum, 46 (1985), 87–103.
MacLean, Simon. Kingship and Politics in the Late Ninth Century: Charles the Fat and the end of the Carolingian Empire. Cambridge: Cambridge University Press, 2003.

9th-century kings of West Francia
Frankish warriors
860s births
882 deaths

Year of birth uncertain
Deaths by horse-riding accident in France
Burials at the Basilica of Saint-Denis
Carolingian dynasty